The 7th Destroyer Flotilla, also styled as the Seventh Destroyer Flotilla, was a military formation of the Royal Navy from 1911 to 1939.

History
The flotilla was first formed in November 1911, and was disbanded in May 1939, before the outbreak of the Second World War. Its first commander was Captain Arthur Hulbert, and its last was Captain Llewellyn Morgan.

Administration

Captains (D) afloat, 7th Destroyer Flotilla
Captain (D) afloat is a Royal Navy appointment of an operational commander of a destroyer flotilla or squadron.

References

Sources
 Field, Andrew (1999). Royal Navy Strategy in the Far East 1919–1939: Planning for War Against Japan. Cambridge, England: Routledge. .
 Harley, Simon; Lovell, Tony. (2018) "Seventh Destroyer Flotilla (Royal Navy) - The Dreadnought Project". www.dreadnoughtproject.org. Harley and Lovell.
 Whitby, Michael (2011). Commanding Canadians: The Second World War Diaries of A.F.C. Layard. Vancouver, Canada: UBC Press. .

External links

Destroyer flotillas of the Royal Navy
Military units and formations established in 1911
Military units and formations disestablished in 1939